Atomopteryx coelodactyla is a moth in the family Crambidae. It was described by Philipp Christoph Zeller in 1863. It is found in Venezuela, Ecuador, Colombia and Chile.

References

Moths described in 1863
Spilomelinae
Moths of South America